The plain of Khanasor geographically lies between the district of Van and Iran, and was once heavily populated by Kurds.

Plains of Turkey
Plains of Iran
Landforms of Van Province